John Rutherford (born 6 November 1908) was an English professional footballer of the 1920s and 1930s. Born in Nenthead, he joined Gillingham in 1927 and went on to make 44 appearances for the club in The Football League. He left to join Watford in 1931.

References

1908 births
Year of death missing
English footballers
Gillingham F.C. players
Watford F.C. players
Association football goalkeepers